Rated X Mas is a Christmas music parody album by Matt Rogers. The songs on the album are parodies of popular Christmas songs, but with graphic and sexual lyrics.

Track listing 
Rogers performed vocals on I Saw Mommy Fucking Santa Claus, Suck On My Cock, and I Love To Choke My Chicken With My Hand, while an uncredited female vocalist performs the other songs (although Rogers provides additional voices in Drunken Santa’s Coming to Town, Rudolph the Deep Throat Reindeer, and Frosty the Pervert).
 Drunken Santa's Coming to Town (parody of Santa Claus Is Coming to Town)
 I Saw Mommy Fucking Santa Claus (parody of I Saw Mommy Kissing Santa Claus)
 Rudolph the Deep Throat Reindeer (parody of Rudolph the Red-Nosed Reindeer)
 Suck on My Cock (parody of Jingle Bell Rock)
 Frosty the Pervert (parody of Frosty the Snowman)
 I Love to Choke My Chicken with My Hand (parody of Winter Wonderland)
 Have Yourself a 1-900-Christmas (parody of Have Yourself a Merry Little Christmas)
 Have a Pornographic Christmas (parody of Holly Jolly Christmas)

Legal controversy
In May 2000, several record labels, including Warner Music Group, sued the album's distributor, Party on Parody Productions, alleging that the album infringed on the copyright of the Christmas songs it spoofs. In December, the case was settled, with the album being pulled from shelves and all remaining unsold copies of the album being forfeited and destroyed.

Reception
Rated X Mas  has received mostly mixed to lukewarm reception. Todd Totale of Glorious Noise gave the album a negative review, declaring it “the worst Christmas album ever made”.

Despite this, the album has garnered a cult following, especially online on sites such as YouTube, where numerous uploads of the album's tracks exist (perhaps the most notable example being Suck On My Cock).

References

External links
 Smoking Gun archive of the Rated X-mas court documents

1997 Christmas albums
1990s comedy albums